WAQX-FM (95.7 MHz) is an alternative rock-formatted radio station licensed to Manlius, New York, United States, serving the Syracuse, New York, market. WAQX-FM is owned and operated by Cumulus Media.

History
On November 29, 1976, AGK Communications, Inc., a company owned by George Kimble, applied to the Federal Communications Commission (FCC) for a new radio station on 95.3 MHz to serve Manlius. The application competed against a bid from Manlius Broadcasting Co., which was owned by Craig Fox. The Kimble and Fox bids merged and won the construction permit on May 10, 1978. Construction immediately ensued on studios in the Market Place complex on Route 92, including Fox doing much of the construction himself as chief engineer, and with an album-oriented rock (AOR) format, WAQX began broadcasting on August 23, 1978. Fox, then 25, and two friends of his from Syracuse University felt that Syracuse could support a commercial AOR station; until then, WAER at the university and WOUR in nearby Utica were the only AOR stations serving the market.

The small WAQX, which went on the air with an effective radiated power of 410 watts, had only been on the air a year when format competition came in the form of a much stronger station: WSYR-FM 94.5, which dropped WAQX's ratings by a full point nearly immediately. An attempt at an "adult rock" format proved to be a disaster, but an upgrade to 3,000 watts and the sale of WSYR-FM and its flip to another format helped lead to a rebound. Ratings rose to double-digit shares in 1984 and 1985, a feat the station would only accomplish one other time—in 1994, when it made its lone appearance as the highest-rated station in Syracuse.

In 1988, after an upgrade in the station's transmitting facility and power prompted it to relocate from 95.3 to 95.7 MHz, Kimble and Fox negotiated the sale of the station to Atlantic Ventures Corporation, a Massachusetts company formed by former executives of the recently sold American Cablesystems, for $4.5 million. The deal also included a construction permit for a new radio station at 670 kHz which would have required a divestiture of a Fox station anyway; Fox owned WOLF (1490 AM), which for five years had simulcast WAQX on the AM band. New studios on James Street were built for WAQX. However, Atlantic soon unloaded WAQX, selling it at a $500,000 loss to Pilot Communications in 1990 to focus on its stations in Rochester and Boston. Neither of the partners in Pilot had owned a radio station before; Pilot would own seven stations in Syracuse and Augusta, Maine, when Broadcasting Partners, a unit of VS&A, invested in the group in 1997.

In 1999, Citadel Communications purchased WAQX and three other Syracuse stations as part of a $190 million purchase of Broadcasting Partners involving 36 stations in 11 markets. Citadel merged with Cumulus Media on September 16, 2011.

References

External links
95X Online

Active rock radio stations in the United States
AQX-FM
Cumulus Media radio stations
Radio stations established in 1978
1978 establishments in New York (state)